Al-Janoub Stadium, formerly known as Al-Wakrah Stadium, is a retractable roof football stadium in Al-Wakrah, Qatar that was inaugurated on 16 May 2019. This was the second among the eight stadiums for the 2022 FIFA World Cup in Qatar, after the renovation of Khalifa International Stadium. It was designed by Iraqi-British architect Zaha Hadid (1950–2016) together with the firms AECOM and Jain and Partners of Dubai.

The stadium features a curvilinear postmodernist and neo-futurist design. The appearance of the roof was inspired by the sails of traditional Dhow boats, used by pearl divers from the region, weaving through currents of the Persian Gulf.

It is the official headquartes of the football club Al-Wakrah SC, where the matches of the Qatar Stars League will be held. The capacity of the stadium is 20,000, previously it was 40,000 before the World Cup.

The stadium is located about 22 km south of Doha.

History

Qatar was chosen to host the 2022 FIFA World Cup in 2010. It would become the first Muslim country and the first country in the Middle East to host the World Cup.  Qatar previously did not have the sporting capability for the Cup, and 8 new stadiums were built for the Cup.

The stadium was inaugurated on 16 May 2019, during the 2019 Amir Cup final between Al Sadd SC and Al-Duhail SC played in front of an audience of 38,678 people, making it the second stadium to be completed after Khalifa International Stadium. This match was attended by the Emir (head of state) of Qatar, Sheikh Tamim bin Hamad Al Thani.

The stadium hosted a semifinal match at the 24th Arabian Gulf Cup.

In December 2020, Al Janoub Stadium hosted the 2020 AFC Champions League Final.

The stadium hosted six matches of the 2021 FIFA Arab Cup.

Like other stadiums constructed for the 2022 FIFA World Cup, Al Janoub Stadium has been subject to controversy on account of the treatment and status of migrant workers employed at the construction sites. Of these, two Nepalese people are confirmed to have died in the construction of Al Janoub Stadium.  In a 2021 report, Amnesty International criticized Qatar for failing to investigate, remedy and prevent migrant workers' deaths.

On 8 September 2020, Qatar introduced migrant reforms in the country that are applied to workers of all sections, regardless of their nationality. According to Qatar’s new labor reforms, workers must be paid a basic minimum wage which must not be less than 1000 riyals. Workers who are provided with only accommodation and no food facilities must be entitled to food allowances (300 riyals) with their basic wage. Moreover, Qatar introduced a wage protection system to ensure that the employers are complying with the reforms and to help, guide and protect the rights of labours. An occupational safety and health policy was adopted by the MOL and the public health to ensure more strategic coordinated and data-driven approaches. Qatar has taken a wide range of measures to improve protections for workers in Qatar which are recognized by independent experts from the International Labour Organization and international unions.

Design

The stadium was designed by the architect Zaha Hadid, and her architectural firm, Zaha Hadid Architects. Zaha Hadid Architects stated that “The stadium was designed in conjunction with a new precinct so that it sits at the heart of an urban extension of the city, creating community-based activities in and around the stadium on non-event days.”

According to the designers, it was inspired by the sails of traditional Dhow boats, used by pearl divers from the region, weaving through currents of the Persian Gulf. The curvilinear roof and exterior references Al Wakrah's history of seafaring, additionally giving spectators the feeling on being on a ship. Bowed beams hold up the roof, resembling a ship's hull. The building is meant to resemble upturned dhow hulls arranged in a huddle to provide shade and shelter. Many observers have pointed out that the design resembles female genitalia—a claim Zaha Hadid dismissed as "embarrassing" and "ridiculous." The roof of the stadium is retractable, and is made from pleated PTFE fabric and cables, with the roof arches being 230 meters long. 

The cooling system prevents the stadium's users from overheating, due to Qatar's hot and arid climate. It is capable of cooling the spectator areas to 18°C and the field of play to 20°C. According to Qatar's Supreme Committee for Delivery & Legacy (SC), "detailed micro-climate analysis informed the arena's shape, with aerodynamics and optimal shading from the roof, which incorporates a minimal amount of glass, making a significant contribution to temperature control."

Facilities
The sports complex includes a multipurpose room, with swimming pools and spas and a shopping center with green roofs. The entrance to the stadium will be on a wooded square.

A school, wedding hall, cycling, horse riding and running tracks, restaurants, marketplaces and gyms within the vicinity are planned to be built to accompany Al Janoub Stadium.

Proposed renovations
After the 2022 FIFA World Cup, Al Janoub Stadium is the Al-Wakrah SC’s home, instead of the current Saoud bin Abdulrahman Stadium. The seating capacity has been halved from 40,000 to 20,000 and is used for Qatar Stars League matches. Qatar Supreme Committee for Delivery & Legacy has claimed that the remaining half of the stadium's seats will be donated to developing countries in need of sporting infrastructure.

Recent tournament results

24th Arabian Gulf Cup

2021 FIFA Arab Cup

2022 FIFA World Cup

Al Janoub Stadium hosted seven matches during the 2022 FIFA World Cup.

References

Wakrah Stadium
Wakrah Stadium
Wakrah Stadium
Retractable-roof stadiums
2019 establishments in Qatar
Sports venues completed in 2019